The Republic of Zambia is a landlocked country in Southern Africa, neighbouring the Democratic Republic of the Congo to the north, Tanzania to the north-east, Malawi to the east, Mozambique, Zimbabwe, Botswana and Namibia to the south, and Angola to the west. The capital city is Lusaka, in the south-central part of Zambia. The population is concentrated mainly around Lusaka in the south and the Copperbelt Province to the northwest, the core economic hubs of the country.

The Zambian economy has historically been based on the copper-mining industry. The discovery of copper is owed partly to Frederick Russell Burnham, the famous American scout who worked for Cecil Rhodes.

Notable firms 
This list includes notable companies with primary headquarters located in the country. The industry and sector follow the Industry Classification Benchmark taxonomy. Organizations which have ceased operations are included and noted as defunct.

List of Largest Firms 
Top ten firms by revenues in ZMW.

See also 
 Economy of Zambia
 List of banks in Zambia
 Lusaka Stock Exchange
 Taxation in Zambia
 High Net Worth Individuals in Zambia
 Bank of Zambia
 Zambian kwacha

References

External links 
  Lusaka Securities Exchange
 Lusaka Securities Exchange (LuSE) on African Markets

 01
Zambia
 01